Tuttle is a city in Grady County, Oklahoma, United States.  The population was 6,019 with the close of the 2010 census, seeing a 40.2% increase from 4,294 in 2000.

History
Located east of the Chisholm Trail, Tuttle was developed as a farming and ranching community.  The town was platted in 1901 and the land was purchased Chickasaw land from the Colbert Family.  The town is named after local rancher James H. Tuttle, a Choctaw by marriage and the father of automobile dealer and politico Holmes Tuttle.  

At the time of its founding, Tuttle was located in Pickens County, Chickasaw Nation.

The right-of-way for the St. Louis and San Francisco Railway came from the tribal allotment of Frances Schrock, a Choctaw.  Schrock Park is named after her.  Tuttle's post office was established in 1902, and the town was incorporated in 1906.

Geography
Tuttle is located at  (35.294963, -97.785683).

Tuttle, located in a low-lying river basin along the South Canadian River, is considered to be part of a rapidly growing area of northern McClain and Grady Counties known as the "Tri-City Area" with Newcastle and Blanchard.

Demographics

As of the census of 2010, there were 6,019 people, 2,178 households, and 1,272 families residing in the city. The population density was 206 people per square mile (56.9/km). There were 2,341 housing units at an average density of 56.5 per square mile (21.8/km). The racial makeup of the city was 88.6% White, 6.1% Native American, 0.4% Asian, 0.09% from other races, and 3.42% from two or more races. Hispanic or Latino of any race were 3.5% of the population. 0.3% of the population is African American.

There were 2,178 households, out of which 33.5% had children under the age of 18 living with them, 67.9% were married couples living together, 9.1% had a female householder with no husband present, and 19.7% were non-families. 16.3% of all households were made up of individuals, and 6.8% had someone living alone who was 65 years of age or older. The average household size was 2.61 and the average family size was 3.02.

In the city, the population was spread out, with 26.7% under the age of 18, 8.5% from 18 to 24, 27.7% from 25 to 44, 26.4% from 45 to 64, and 12.6% who were 65 years of age or older. The median age was 37 years. For every 100 females, there were 97.5 males. For every 100 females age 18 and over, there were 92.4 males.

The median income for a household in the city was $56,126, and the median income for a family was $48,682. Males had a median income of $35,599 versus $25,850 for females. The per capita income for the city was $26,707. About 4.5% of families and 9.8% of the population were below the poverty line, including 6.0% of those under age 18 and 10.2% of those age 65 or over.

Economy
Tuttle is a largely agricultural community with a focus on wheat, cotton, corn, alfalfa hay, Bermuda grass hay, and cattle. Nearby Braum's Dairy, the largest farm in the area, is located just outside the city's limits and has a market presence spanning several states.  The city serves as a minor bedroom community of Oklahoma City.

Education
The Tuttle Public School system is divided into five buildings: Early Childhood Development (grades Pre-K and K) Tuttle Elementary (grades 1–3), Tuttle Intermediate School (grades 4–5), Tuttle Middle School (grades 6–8), and Tuttle High School (grades 9–12). Their colors are cardinal red and white, and their mascot is the Tiger.

The Tigers have won 79 state championships in their history as recognized by the Oklahoma Secondary Schools Athletic Association.

The following is a list of the sports in which the school won the state championship:

Baseball - 4 (1988, 2006, 2009, 2014)
Cheerleading - 18 (Competitive State: 1989, 1990, 1991, 1993, 1994, 1995, 1996, 1997, 1998, 2009, 2014, 2015, 2016, 2017, 2018, 2019, 2020) (Game Day State: 2018)
Football - 3 (2001, 2005, 2018)
 Girls Basketball - 1 (2021)
Girls Golf - 1 (2011)
Softball - 11 (1994, 1995, 1996, 1997, 2001, 2007, 2008, 2016, 2017, 2018, 2020)
Boys Track - 1 (2017)
Wrestling - 40 (Tournament State: 1990, 1996, 1997, 2002, 2003, 2009, 2010, 2011, 2012, 2013, 2014, 2015, 2016, 2017, 2018, 2019, 2020, 2021, 2022, 2023)  (Dual State: 1989, 1990, 1992, 1997, 1998, 2002, 2010, 2011, 2012, 2013, 2014, 2015, 2016, 2017, 2018, 2019, 2020, 2021, 2022, 2023)

Tuttle has been featured in an Independent Lens series documenting bullying.

Tuttle gained media attention on May 6, 2015 following a tornado that touched down near "Tiger Safari", a local safari park. Nicknamed "Tigernado", it quickly became a popular hashtag on the social media platform Twitter after reports were made that tigers had escaped the facility. The reports were later falsified by the owner after confirming the tiger enclosures were still secure.

Notable people

 Clyde Conner – Former wide receiver with the National Football League's San Francisco 49ers
 Alfred P. Murrah – Chief Judge, United States Court of Appeals for the Tenth Circuit
 Chad Richison – Founder and CEO of Paycom Software, Inc.
 Jason White - Former Heisman trophy-winning quarterback for the University of Oklahoma Sooners 
 Blake Jarwin – Tight end with the NFL's Dallas Cowboys

References

External links
 City of Tuttle

Oklahoma City metropolitan area
Cities in Grady County, Oklahoma
Cities in Oklahoma